Angela Patrice Hill  (born January 12, 1985) is an American mixed martial artist who competes in the strawweight division. She was formerly signed with the Invicta Fighting Championships, of which she was the strawweight champion. She is also a former World Kickboxing Association champion. Hill currently fights for the Ultimate Fighting Championship. As of March 7, 2023, she is #13 in the UFC women's strawweight rankings.

Background
Hill received a bachelor of fine arts degree at the Cooper Union school of art. Before becoming a professional fighter, she worked as an animator in animation studios and as a bartender.

Hill is also a video gamer and cosplayer, and several times appeared in costume before fights at Invicta. She has cosplayed as Dhalsim, Afro Samurai, a Fallout Vault Dweller, and as one of The Warriors, among others.

Mixed martial arts career

Early career
Hill began her professional MMA career in 2014. She has amassed a win over future Invicta fighter Stephanie Skinner.

The Ultimate Fighter
In June 2014, it was announced that Hill was one of the fighters selected by the UFC to appear on The Ultimate Fighter: A Champion Will Be Crowned. She faced Carla Esparza in the preliminary round and lost via submission in the first round.

Ultimate Fighting Championship
Hill's first fight after The Ultimate Fighter was against Emily Kagan at The Ultimate Fighter: A Champion Will Be Crowned Finale on December 12, 2014. Tecia Torres fought at UFC 188 and defeated Hill.

Hill faced Rose Namajunas at UFC 192 on October 3, 2015. She lost the fight by submission in the first round. She was subsequently released from the promotion.

Invicta FC
On November 17, 2015, Hill announced on her official Facebook page that she signed with Invicta FC. She made her debut for the promotion at Invicta FC 15 on January 16, 2016, and successfully notched a first round TKO victory over Alida Gray. Hill returned less than two months later on March 11, 2016, and knocked out former strawweight title challenger Stephanie Eggink in the second round, earning her first Performance of the Night bonus as a result of the finish.

Hill made another quick turnaround to face undefeated strawweight champion Lívia Renata Souza for the title at Invicta FC 17 on May 7, 2016. She won the fight via split decision to become the new Invicta FC Strawweight champion.

UFC return
Hill and Jéssica Andrade were briefly linked to a bout at UFC 207. However, the fight never materialized for that event because of a rule in the UFC's anti-doping policy with USADA. Subsequently, Andrade was removed from that card with the pairing left intact and rescheduled to take place at UFC Fight Night: Bermudez vs. Korean Zombie on February 4, 2017. Andrade won the fight by unanimous decision. In addition, both participants were awarded Fight of the Night honors.

Hill faced Ashley Yoder on July 7, 2017, at The Ultimate Fighter 25 Finale. She won the fight by unanimous decision.

Hill faced Nina Ansaroff at UFC Fight Night: Poirier vs. Pettis on November 11, 2017, in Norfolk, Virginia. She lost the fight via unanimous decision.

Hill faced Maryna Moroz at UFC on Fox: Emmett vs. Stephens on February 24, 2018, at Amway Center in Orlando, Florida. She won the fight by unanimous decision.

Hill was scheduled to face Alexa Grasso on August 25, 2018, at UFC Fight Night 135. However, Grasso was pulled out from the bout on July 19, 2018, due to knee injury and she was replaced by Cortney Casey. She lost the fight via split decision.

Hill faced Randa Markos on March 23, 2019, at UFC Fight Night: Thompson vs. Pettis. She lost the fight via a submission in round one.

Hill replaced an injured Jessica Penne against Jodie Esquibel on April 27, 2019, at UFC Fight Night: Jacaré vs. Hermansson. She won the fight by unanimous decision.

Hill faced Yan Xiaonan, replacing injured Felice Herrig, on June 8, 2019, at UFC 238. She lost the fight by unanimous decision.

Hill was scheduled to face Istela Nunes on September 21, 2019, at UFC on ESPN+ 17. However, on August 12, 2019, it was reported that Nunes was removed from the card due to a failed drug test, and she was replaced by Ariane Carnelossi. Hill won the fight via TKO due to a doctor's stoppage in the third round after an elbow she threw cut Carnelossi over the left eye and rendered her unable to continue.

Hill faced Hannah Cifers, replacing Brianna Van Buren on January 25, 2020, at UFC Fight Night 166. She won the fight via technical knockout in round two.

Hill accepted a short notice fight once again, replacing Hannah Goldy to fight Loma Lookboonmee at UFC Fight Night: Felder vs. Hooker on February 23, 2020. She won the fight via unanimous decision.

Hill faced Cláudia Gadelha on May 16, 2020, at UFC on ESPN: Overeem vs. Harris. She lost the bout via split decision. 13 of 17 media outlets scored the fight in favor of Hill.

Hill was scheduled to meet Michelle Waterson on August 22, 2020, at  UFC on ESPN 15. However, due to some personal reasons on Waterson’s side, the bout was moved three weeks later to the 5 rounds main event at UFC Fight Night: Waterson vs. Hill.  Hill lost the fight via split decision. This fight earned her the Fight of the Night award.

A rematch with Tecia Torres was expected to take place on December 12, 2020, at UFC 256. However, Hill was forced to pull out from the event due to testing positive for COVID-19.

Hill was scheduled to face Ashley Yoder in a rematch of their 2017 bout on February 27, 2021, at UFC Fight Night 186. However, day of the event it was announced that the bout was scrapped from the card after one of Yoder's cornermen tested positive COVID-19. The bout was rescheduled and took place at UFC Fight Night: Edwards vs. Muhammad on March 13. Hill won the fight via unanimous decision.

Hill was scheduled to meet Amanda Ribas on May 8, 2021, at UFC on ESPN 24.  However, the day of the event Ribas was removed from the bout due to COVID-19 protocols and the bout was cancelled. The bout was rescheduled for UFC Fight Night 189 on June 5, 2021.  Two weeks later, the pairing was scrapped once again as Ribas was still suffering from lingering COVID-19 symptoms. Hill lost the fight via unanimous decision.

The rematch with Tecia Torres was rescheduled and took place on August 7, 2021, at UFC 265. Hill lost the fight via unanimous decision.

Hill faced Amanda Lemos, replacing Nina Nunes, on December 18, 2021, at UFC Fight Night 199. Hill lost the bout via split decision. 10 out of 11 media scores gave it to Hill. This bout earned the Fight of the Night bonus award.

Hill faced Virna Jandiroba on May 14, 2022, at UFC on ESPN 36. She lost the bout via unanimous decision.

Hill faced Lupita Godinez on August 13, 2022, at UFC on ESPN 41. She won the fight via unanimous decision.

Hill faced Emily Ducote on December 3, 2022, at UFC on ESPN 42. She won the bout via unanimous decision.

Hill is scheduled to face  Mackenzie Dern on May 13, 2023 at UFC Fight Night 224.

Championships and accomplishments
Ultimate Fighting Championship
Fight of the Night (Three times) 
Most bouts in UFC Women's Strawweight division history (21)
Most losses in UFC Women's Strawweight division history (12)
Second most bouts in UFC Women's history (22)
Tied (Jorge Masvidal, Clay Guida and Paul Felder) for most split decision losses in UFC history (4)
MMAjunkie.com
2020 September Fight of the Month

Mixed martial arts record

|-
|Win
|align=center|15–12
|Emily Ducote
|Decision (unanimous)
|UFC on ESPN: Thompson vs. Holland
|
|align=center|3
|align=center|5:00
|Orlando, Florida, United States
|
|-
|Win
|align=center|14–12
|Lupita Godinez
|Decision (unanimous)
|UFC on ESPN: Vera vs. Cruz
|
|align=center|3
|align=center|5:00
|San Diego, California, United States
|
|-
|Loss
|align=center|13–12
|Virna Jandiroba 
|Decision (unanimous)
|UFC on ESPN: Błachowicz vs. Rakić 
| 
|align=center|3
|align=center|5:00
|Las Vegas, Nevada, United States
|
|-
|Loss
|align=center|13–11
|Amanda Lemos
|Decision (split)
|UFC Fight Night: Lewis vs. Daukaus
|
|align=center|3
|align=center|5:00
|Las Vegas, Nevada, United States
|
|-
|Loss
|align=center|13–10
|Tecia Torres
|Decision (unanimous)
|UFC 265
|
|align=center|3
|align=center|5:00
|Houston, Texas, United States
|
|-
|Win
|align=center|13–9
|Ashley Yoder
|Decision (unanimous)
|UFC Fight Night: Edwards vs. Muhammad
|
|align=center|3
|align=center|5:00
|Las Vegas, Nevada, United States
|
|-
|Loss
|align=center|12–9
|Michelle Waterson
|Decision (split)
|UFC Fight Night: Waterson vs. Hill
|
|align=center|5
|align=center|5:00
|Las Vegas, Nevada, United States
|
|-
|Loss
|align=center|12–8
|Cláudia Gadelha
|Decision (split)
|UFC on ESPN: Overeem vs. Harris
|
|align=center|3
|align=center|5:00
|Jacksonville, Florida, United States
|
|-
|Win
|align=center|12–7
|Loma Lookboonmee
|Decision (unanimous)
|UFC Fight Night: Felder vs. Hooker
|
|align=center|3
|align=center|5:00
|Auckland, New Zealand
|
|-
|Win
|align=center|11–7
|Hannah Cifers
|TKO (elbows and punches)
|UFC Fight Night: Blaydes vs. dos Santos
|
|align=center|2
|align=center|4:26
|Raleigh, North Carolina, United States
|
|-
|Win
|align=center|10–7
|Ariane Carnelossi
|TKO (doctor stoppage)
|UFC Fight Night: Rodríguez vs. Stephens
|
|align=center|3
|align=center|1:56
|Mexico City, Mexico
|
|-
|Loss
|align=center|9–7
|Yan Xiaonan
|Decision (unanimous)
|UFC 238
|
|align=center|3
|align=center|5:00
|Chicago, Illinois, United States
|
|-
|Win
|align=center|9–6
|Jodie Esquibel
|Decision (unanimous)
|UFC Fight Night: Jacaré vs. Hermansson
|
|align=center|3
|align=center|5:00
|Sunrise, Florida, United States
|
|-
|Loss
|align=center|8–6
|Randa Markos
|Submission (armbar)
|UFC Fight Night: Thompson vs. Pettis
|
|align=center|1
|align=center|4:24
|Nashville, Tennessee, United States
|
|-
|Loss
|align=center|8–5
|Cortney Casey
|Decision (split)
|UFC Fight Night: Gaethje vs. Vick
|
|align=center|3
|align=center|5:00
|Lincoln, Nebraska, United States
|
|-  
|Win
|align=center|8–4
|Maryna Moroz
|Decision (unanimous)
|UFC on Fox: Emmett vs. Stephens
|
|align=center|3
|align=center|5:00
|Orlando, Florida, United States
|
|-
|Loss
|align=center|7–4
|Nina Ansaroff
|Decision (unanimous)
|UFC Fight Night: Poirier vs. Pettis
|
|align=center|3
|align=center|5:00
|Norfolk, Virginia, United States
|
|-
|Win
|align=center|7–3
|Ashley Yoder
|Decision (unanimous)
|The Ultimate Fighter: Redemption Finale
|
|align=center|3
|align=center|5:00
|Las Vegas, Nevada, United States
|
|-
|Loss
|align=center|6–3
|Jéssica Andrade
|Decision (unanimous)
|UFC Fight Night: Bermudez vs. The Korean Zombie
|
|align=center|3
|align=center|5:00
|Houston, Texas, United States
|
|-
|Win
|align=center|6–2
|Kaline Medeiros
|Decision (unanimous)
|Invicta FC 20: Evinger vs. Kunitskaya
|
|align=center|5
|align=center|5:00
|Kansas City, Missouri, United States
|
|-
|Win
|align=center|5–2
|Lívia Renata Souza
|Decision (split)
|Invicta FC 17: Evinger vs. Schneider
|
|align=center|5
|align=center|5:00
|Costa Mesa, California, United States
|
|-
|Win
|align=center|4–2
|Stephanie Eggink
|KO (punch)
|Invicta FC 16: Hamasaki vs. Brown
|
|align=center|2
|align=center|2:36
|Las Vegas, Nevada, United States
|
|-
|Win
|align=center|3–2
|Alida Gray
|TKO (knee to the body)
|Invicta FC 15: Cyborg vs. Ibragimova
|
|align=center|1
|align=center|1:39
|Costa Mesa, California, United States
|
|-
|Loss
|align=center|2–2
|Rose Namajunas
|Submission (rear-naked choke)
|UFC 192
|
|align=center|1
|align=center|2:47
|Houston, Texas, United States
|
|-
|Loss
|align=center|2–1
|Tecia Torres
|Decision (unanimous)
|UFC 188
|
|align=center|3
|align=center|5:00
|Mexico City, Mexico
|
|-
|Win
|align=center|2–0
|Emily Kagan
|Decision (unanimous)
|The Ultimate Fighter: A Champion Will Be Crowned Finale
|
|align=center|3
|align=center|5:00
|Las Vegas, Nevada, United States
|
|-
|Win
|align=center|1–0
|Stephanie Skinner
|TKO (knees)
|USFFC 18: Metal and Mayhem
|
|align=center|2
|align=center|1:35
|Winston-Salem, North Carolina, United States
|
|-
|}

Mixed martial arts exhibition record

|-
|Loss
|align=center|0–1
|Carla Esparza
|Submission (standing rear-naked choke)
|The Ultimate Fighter: A Champion Will Be Crowned
| (airdate)
|align=center|1
|align=center|3:42
|Las Vegas, Nevada, United States
|

Kickboxing record (incomplete)

|- style="background:#cfc;"
|
| style="text-align:center;"|Win
| Ashley Nichols
|Friday Night Fights
| Broad Street Ballroom, New York, New York, United States
| style="text-align:center;"|Decision (Split)
|align=center|3
|align=center|3:00
| style="text-align:center;"|16–0
|-
! style=background:white colspan=9 |
|- style="background:#cfc;"
|
| style="text-align:center;"|Win
| Monique Travis	
|Lion Fight 11 
| Fremont Street Experience, Las Vegas, Nevada, United States
| style="text-align:center;"|Decision (Unanimous)
|align=center|3
|align=center|3:00
| style="text-align:center;"|15–0
|-
|- style="background:#cfc;"
|
| style="text-align:center;"|Win
| Miranda Cayabyab	
|Lion Fight 10
| Hard Rock Hotel & Casino, Las Vegas, Nevada, United States
| style="text-align:center;"|KO
|align=center|1
|align=center|N/A
| style="text-align:center;"|14–0
|-
|- style="background:#cfc;"
|
| style="text-align:center;"|Win
| Ariana Gomez	
|Take-On Muay Thai 19
| Resorts World Casino, Queens, New York City, United States
| style="text-align:center;"|Decision (Unanimous)
|align=center|3
|align=center|3:00
| style="text-align:center;"|13–0
|-
|- style="background:#cfc;"
|
| style="text-align:center;"|Win
| Jill Guido
|Friday Night Fights
| New York City, New York, United States
| style="text-align:center;"|Decision (Majority)
|align=center|3
|align=center|3:00
| style="text-align:center;"|12–0
|-
|- style="background:#cfc;"
|
| style="text-align:center;"|Win
| Sheila Adamos	
|Friday Night Fights
| New York City, New York, United States 
| style="text-align:center;"|Decision (Unanimous)
|align=center|3
|align=center|3:00
| style="text-align:center;"|11–0
|-
! style=background:white colspan=9 |
|-
| colspan=9 | Legend:

References

External links
 
 

1986 births
Living people
American female kickboxers
American Muay Thai practitioners
Female Muay Thai practitioners
American female mixed martial artists
Flyweight kickboxers
Flyweight mixed martial artists
Strawweight mixed martial artists
Mixed martial artists utilizing Muay Thai
Mixed martial artists utilizing Brazilian jiu-jitsu
Mixed martial artists from Maryland
African-American mixed martial artists
Sportspeople from Maryland
Cooper Union alumni
Cosplayers
People from Clinton, Maryland
Ultimate Fighting Championship female fighters
American practitioners of Brazilian jiu-jitsu
Female Brazilian jiu-jitsu practitioners